Ecuador–Indonesia relations refer to bilateral relations between Ecuador and Indonesia. Relations were established on April 29, 1980, however it was not until November 2004 that Ecuador established their embassy in Jakarta, and reciprocated 6 years later on November 11, 2010 that Indonesia finally opened its embassy in Quito. Both countries are the members of Forum of East Asia-Latin America Cooperation and Non-Aligned Movement.

On June 22 and 23, 2012, Indonesian President Susilo Bambang Yudhoyono visited Quito and meet his counterpart President Rafael Correa of Ecuador. They also witnessed the signing of several memorandums of understanding between two nations. The visit was also meant to reciprocate the Ecuadorian president's visit to Indonesia back in November 2007. The bilateral relations mainly in the energy sector, Ecuador has some oil and gas fields and offered Indonesia the opportunity to invest in the petroleum industry. In 2013 the bilateral trade volume reached US$94.54 million with trade balance in favour to Indonesia with US$68.30 million surplusses.

References

External links
Embassy of Indonesia in Quito - Ecuador

Indonesia
Bilateral relations of Indonesia